The Multidisciplinary Association for Psychedelic Studies (MAPS) is an American nonprofit organization working to raise awareness and understanding of psychedelic substances. MAPS was founded in 1986 by Rick Doblin and is now based in San Jose, California.

MAPS helps scientists design, fund, and obtain regulatory approval for studies of the safety and effectiveness of a number of controlled substances. MAPS works closely with government regulatory authorities worldwide such as the United States Food and Drug Administration (FDA) and the European Medicines Agency (EMA) to ensure that all of its sponsored research protocols conform to ethical and procedural guidelines for clinical drug research. Included in MAPS' research efforts are MDMA (methylenedioxymethamphetamine) for the treatment of posttraumatic stress disorder (PTSD); LSD and psilocybin for the treatment of anxiety, cluster headaches, and depression associated with end-of-life issues; ibogaine for the treatment of opiate addiction, ayahuasca for the treatment of drug addiction and PTSD; medical cannabis for PTSD; and alternative delivery systems for medical cannabis such as vaporizers and water pipes. MAPS officials say the organization's ultimate goal is to establish a network of clinics where these and other treatments can be provided together with other therapies under the guidance of trained, licensed physicians and therapists.

In addition to sponsoring scientific research, MAPS organizes continuing medical education (CME) conferences, sponsors and presents lectures and seminars on the state of psychedelic and medical marijuana research, provides psychedelic harm reduction services through the Zendo Project at events such as music festivals and Burning Man, and publishes a triannual magazine-style publication, the MAPS Bulletin, with updates about its ongoing research efforts, legal struggles, and educational initiatives.  MAPS also publishes books dealing with the science, history, and culture of psychedelic research and psychedelic therapy.

History

Founding MAPS 

Anticipating that the Drug Enforcement Administration (DEA) would move to criminalize MDMA in light of the drug's increasing popularity in recreational use, Rick Doblin, Alise Agar and Debby Harlow organized a nonprofit group called Earth Metabolic Design Laboratories (EMDL) to advocate for the potential therapeutic use of MDMA. By 1984 the DEA had announced its intention to designate MDMA as a Schedule I substance, a categorization that would greatly restrict and regulate the drug's availability, as well as indicate that it held no accepted medical use and a high abuse potential.

EMDL organized supporters to petition the DEA for a scheduling hearing regarding MDMA. Dr. George Greer, Dr. Lester Grinspoon, Professor James Bakalar, and Professor Thomas Roberts contributed to the argument that MDMA belonged in Schedule III, a category that would more readily enable future research and permit the continuation of its use in psychotherapy. Despite such efforts, the DEA pursued emergency scheduling in 1985, citing an imminent risk to public health.

As MDMA was now deemed illegal, held in the same category as such substances as heroin, the only way for it to be employed in scientific inquiry would be through the lengthy and expensive FDA approval process. Holding the belief that MDMA had the unique potential both to aid psychotherapy and eventually to become a prescription medicine, Rick Doblin sought to gain incorporation for MAPS as a 501(c)(3) nonprofit research and educational organization. The founding of MAPS was a primary step toward the future envisioning of what Doblin has called a "nonprofit psychedelic-pharmaceutical company." Chartered in 1986, MAPS has since contributed over 12 million dollars towards the scientific study of psychedelics and cannabis in therapeutic applications.

Controversies 

In 2022, video of MAPS therapists spooning and pinning down a clinical trial participant in a phase 2 trial for MDMA for PTSD emerged as part of the reporting for the Cover Story: Power Trip podcast by New York Magazine and Psymposia. Following treatment, one of the therapists sexually coerced the patient and the patient moved to live with the therapists for two years. 

In 2019, MAPS had claimed that "Monitoring of study records throughout the course of the trial and afterwards did not indicate signs of ethical violation....The protective measures in place include having two therapy providers in every therapy visit, video recording of all therapy visits, monitoring of study and therapy activities, and clinical supervision. In this case, none of these measures were sufficient." However, in 2022, MAPS spokesperson Betty Aldworth claimed that MAPS staff did not actually view the videos until November 2021, following an interview with Rick Doblin for Cover Story: Power Trip.

Projects 

Since 1986, MAPS has distributed over $20 million to fund psychedelics and medical cannabis research and education. These include:

 Erowid and MAPS have been collaborating on two large reference database projects since 2001. Erowid has been providing expertise and work developing and coordinating construction of an online MDMA Reference library and MAPS begun working on doing a similar project with the Albert Hofmann Foundation's LSD and Psilocybin Library.
 Designed a study to examine vaporized or smoked marijuana in the treatment of war related PTSD in veterans, which will evaluate efficacy and safety of multiple strains of herbal cannabis.  The study has received FDA approval. MAPS is pursuing the purchase of appropriate strains from the US federal government.
 Sponsored efforts by Prof. Lyle Craker, Medicinal Plant Program, UMass Amherst Department of Plant and Soil Sciences, to obtain a license from the Drug Enforcement Administration for a marijuana production facility.
 Sponsored analytical research into the effects of the marijuana vaporizer, leading to the first human study of marijuana vaporizers conducted by Dr. Donald Abrams of the University of California, San Francisco.
 Funded the successful efforts of Dr. Donald Abrams to obtain approval for the first human study in 15 years into the therapeutic use of marijuana, along with a $1 million grant from the National Institute on Drug Abuse.
 Obtained Orphan Drug designation from the FDA for smoked marijuana in the treatment of AIDS Wasting Syndrome.
 Supported long-term follow-up studies of pioneering research with LSD and psilocybin originally conducted in the 1950s and 1960s.
 Sponsoring research by Dr. Evgeny Krupitsky into ketamine-assisted psychotherapy as a potential treatment for heroin addiction and alcoholism.
 Sponsoring programs and services at festivals, community events, churches, and schools that provide psychedelic harm reduction and education.
 A clinical study evaluating the treatment of cluster headaches using low doses of the tryptamine psilocybin (found in psilocybin mushrooms) is being developed by researchers at Harvard Medical School, McLean Hospital in conjunction with MAPS.
 Performed several small clinical studies described below, and in some cases, published the results in scientific journals.

Organization

Board and staff 

MAPS is governed by a board of directors including John Gilmore, David Bronner, Robert J. Barnhart, and Rick Doblin. Ashawna Hailey served on the board until her death in 2011.

Funding 

MAPS is a nonprofit 501(c)(3) research and educational organization, funded by donations from individuals and foundations.  Donations to MAPS can be restricted to fund a specific project, or be unrestricted. MAPS also receives revenue from conferences and events, such as the Psychedelic Science conference, as well as from the sale of books, merchandise, and art. With a policy of transparency in financial matters, MAPS publishes a detailed annual financial report. On August 20, 2020, having raised $30 million in non-profit donations in less than six months, MAPS and the Psychedelic Science Funders Collaborative (PSFC) announced the completion of the Capstone Campaign, a non-profit fundraising effort to fund the final research required to seek U.S. Food and Drug Administration (FDA) approval of MDMA-assisted psychotherapy for posttraumatic stress disorder (PTSD).

Legal efforts

Medical cannabis monopoly 

National Institute on Drug Abuse (NIDA) has a government granted monopoly on the production of cannabis for medical research purposes. In the past, the institute has refused to supply marijuana to researchers who had obtained all other necessary federal permits. Medical marijuana researchers and activists claim that NIDA, which is not supposed to be a regulatory organization, does not have the authority to effectively regulate who does and doesn't get to do research with medical marijuana. Jag Davies of the Multidisciplinary Association for Psychedelic Studies (MAPS) writes in MAPS Bulletin:

NIDA administers a contract with the University of Mississippi to grow the nation's only legal cannabis crop for medical and research purposes, including the Compassionate Investigational New Drug program.  United States federal law registers cannabis as a Schedule I drug. Medical marijuana researchers typically prefer to use high-potency marijuana, but NIDA's National Advisory Council on Drug Abuse has been reluctant to provide cannabis with high THC levels, citing safety concerns:

Major events in recent proceedings are notable, as in the 2007 ruling by Administrative Law Judge Mary Ellen Bittner, wherein she recommended that Craker receive a license to grow marijuana for research and that NIDA dismantle its monopoly. The DEA in response overturned the recommended ruling in January 2009, and later denied Craker's Motion to Reconsider in December 2010. In March 2011, Craker's lawyers submitted their final brief in the case. MAPS is pursuing efforts to have the DEA's final ruling rescinded. A detailed timeline of MAPS' attempts to gain access to research grade marijuana is available on the MAPS website.

In 2016, the Obama administration DEA announced their intent to grant additional licenses to marijuana growers for research, ending the NIDA monopoly on federally legal marijuana. The DEA finalized the proposed rule in early 2020.

See also 
 Drug development
 Beckley Foundation
 Heffter Research Institute
 TAPS The Latin America Version of MAPS for Therapists

References

External links 
 
 List of MAPS staff

Psychedelic drug research
Drug policy organizations based in the United States
Drug policy reform
Non-profit organizations based in California
Organizations established in 1986
Medical and health organizations based in California
501(c)(3) organizations
1986 establishments in California
Medicinal use of cannabis organizations based in the United States